Cieli di Toscana (Tuscan Skies) is Andrea Bocelli's eighth studio album, released in 2001.

Released in October 2001, the album spent a total of two weeks at No. 3 on the official UK albums chart, the highest chart position ever for a foreign-language pop album, and reached the top 5 in over 10 other countries.

Tuscan Skies, a DVD of music videos of most of the songs of the album, was released the following year.

Track listing

  "Melodramma" (4:09)
  "Mille Lune Mille Onde" (4:01)
  "E  Sara' A Settembre (Someone Like You)" (5:06)
  "Chiara" (4:04)
  "Mascagni" (4:12)
  "Resta Qui" (4:10)
  "Il Mistero Dell'Amore" (4:30)
  "Se La Gente Usasse Il Cuore" (5:00)
  "Si Voltò" (4:07)
  "L'Abitudine" (4:21) (Feat. Helena Hellwig)
  "L'Incontro" (4:52) (Feat. Bono)
  "E Mi Manchi Tu" (5:03)
  "Il Diavolo E L'Angelo" (4:03)
  "L'Ultimo Re" (3:48)
  "Tornera la Neve" (4:05) (Bonus track)

Reception

Commercial performance

Cieli di Toscana sold millions of copies in a few weeks after its release, and quickly become the biggest selling album in the world in 2001, No. 1 on the CNN Worldbeat Global Album Chart.

In the United States, the album peaked at No. 11 on the Billboard 200 chart, with 85,000 units sold in its first week,  and blew through 177,000 copies over Christmas week of 2001, Bocelli's best sales week in America, at the time. That record stood for the following 8 years, until My Christmas, Bocelli's first Holiday album, was released in late 2009 and achieved better sales weeks. The album performed better on six consecutive weeks during the Holiday season, with 185,000, 218,000, 428,000, 400,000, 390,000, and 284,000 copies sold on each, in the United States.

The album topped the charts in Sweden and the Netherlands, and reached the top 3 in at least 8 other countries, including the UK, where it spent two weeks at No. 3 on the albums chart, Bocelli's highest chart position in the country to date, and the highest chart position ever for a foreign-language pop album.

Charts

Weekly charts

Year-end charts

Certifications and sales

Music videos
Music videos of 10 songs of the album were filmed in Tuscany, in 2001.
Tuscan Skies (Cieli di Toscana) a DVD containing those videos was released January 15, 2002.

See also

Tuscan Skies (Cieli di Toscana)

References

External links
 [ Cieli Di Toscana] on Billboard.com
 Cieli Di Toscana on Ultratop.com

Andrea Bocelli albums
Decca Records albums
2001 albums
Classical crossover albums